Value Drug Mart is a Western Canada drug store serving over 36 locations throughout Alberta and British Columbia.

History
What is now known as Value Drug Mart Associates Ltd. was founded by pharmacist Barry Katz (whose son Daryl Katz would go on to found Canada's largest chain of pharmacies, the Katz Group of Companies) and twelve other pharmacists in 1978.

Since 1983, VDMA has been the sole sponsor of the annual Value Drug Mart Spring Classic hockey tournament that takes place in Calgary, Alberta. The tournament is a weekend-long competition of ice hockey teams from across the province of Alberta.

Products
In addition to  prescription drugs, lottery tickets, snack foods, soda, magazines, movies, books, fragrances, gift ware, and stationery are all sold in most locations. A post office is usually within some stores.

Locations
Value Drug Mart operates over 35 locations in the provinces of Alberta and British Columbia. It is not a franchise; rather, the different locations  own VDMA as shareholders.

Alberta
Athabasca
Bonnyville
Boyle
Calmar
Camrose 
Cardston
Castor
Cold Lake (2)
Cochrane
Coronation
Didsbury
Drayton Valley
Drumheller
Edmonton
Fairview
Grande Prairie
Grimshaw
Lac La Biche
Lamont
Manning
Mayerthorpe
Oyen
Peace River
Red Deer
Rimbey
Rocky Mountain House
St. Paul
Stettler
Strathmore
Sylvan Lake
Vegreville
Vermilion
Wainwright
Wetaskiwin

British Columbia
Fernie
Grand Forks

References

Retail companies established in 1978
Canadian pharmacy brands